The 1994 Wan Chai District Board election was held on 18 September 1994 to elect all 10 elected members to the Wan Chai District Board.

Overall election results
Before election:

Change in composition:

Results by constituency

Canal Road

Causeway Bay

Happy Valley

Hennessy

Jardine's Lookout

Oi Kwan

Southorn

Stubbs Road

Tai Fat Hau

Tai Hang

See also
 1994 Hong Kong local elections

References

1994 Hong Kong local elections
Wan Chai District Council elections